Crockett Brown was a state legislator in Arkansas. He served in the Arkansas House of Representatives representing Lee County, Arkansas in 1877. He served from the county with Patrick T. Price.

He was noted as a politician in an interview of a former slave.

See also
 African-American officeholders during and following the Reconstruction era

References

19th-century American politicians
Republican Party members of the Arkansas House of Representatives
People from Lee County, Arkansas
Year of birth missing